Downward Is Heavenward is the fourth studio album by the Champaign, Illinois alternative rock band Hum.

Release
Downward Is Heavenward was recorded in 1997, and first released on January 27, 1998 by RCA Records. Some websites such as AllMusic list it as being a 1997 album rather than a 1998 album, presumably because all versions of the album bear a 1997 copyright date.

The title of the album appears as a lyric in "Afternoon with the Axolotls".

Reception
Despite selling fewer copies than its predecessor You'd Prefer an Astronaut, the album was critically acclaimed. Brent DiCrescenzo from Pitchfork Media praised the abrasive but graceful nature of the album, writing, "A listen to Downward Is Heavenward actually scrubs off a layer of skin, yet Hum still manage to infuse grace and control into their skyward swirl." Ned Raggett from Allmusic wrote, "Having scored their fluke hit with 'Stars', Hum hunkered down and created a follow-up album that went nowhere, leading to the band's splintering. An unfortunate result all around, because, arguably, Downward Is Heavenward isn't merely the group's best album, but a lost classic of '90s rock, period." In 1999, Pitchfork Media placed the album at #81 on their top 100 albums of the 1990s.

Track listing
"Isle of the Cheetah" – 6:38
"Comin' Home" – 2:45
"If You Are to Bloom" – 5:11
"Ms. Lazarus" – 3:38
"Afternoon with the Axolotls" – 6:27
"Green to Me" – 3:56
"Dreamboat" – 6:07
"The Inuit Promise" – 6:07
"Apollo" – 5:47
"The Scientists" – 5:26

Bonus single (received by fans who pre-ordered the album)
"Puppets" – 4:11
"Aphids" – 6:08

2018 vinyl release bonus tracks
"Puppets" – 4:11
"Aphids" – 6:08
"Boy with Stick" – 5:42

Personnel
Hum
Jeff Dimpsey – bass guitar
Tim Lash – guitar
Bryan St. Pere – drums
Matt Talbott – guitar, vocals

Additional personnel
Mark Rubel – production

References

1998 albums
Hum (band) albums
RCA Records albums